Rakim & Ken-Y is a reggaeton duo formed in 2003 by José Nieves (Rakim) and Kenny Vázquez (Ken-Y). The artists are renowned in the Latin music world for being the first to successfully fuse mainstream pop music with the reggaeton street rhythms of Puerto Rico and expose the style to a wide international audience. The sound introduced by Rakim & Ken-Y would go on to inspire the pop reggaeton songs of successful acts such as CNCO, J Balvin and Maluma. The duo had a very successful career with the Spanish speaking audience of Latin America, the United States and Spain until their separation in 2013. In June 2017, the duo announced their official return by Pina Records. In Mid 2021 the Duo have confirmed that they are on hiatus and are currently working on their solo projects.

Early career 
Rakim & Ken-Y hail both from Gurabo, Puerto Rico, Ken-Y was born on September 7, 1986 and have turned into one of the most recognized duos in Reggaeton.  The duo started their music career in high school. R.K.M (formerly known as "Rakim" but changed to avoid confusion with the established hip-hop artist Rakim) was inspired by the explosion of reggaeton music in the 1990s. He encouraged Ken-Y to join him to form a duo; they performed at 15th birthday parties (quinceañeras) and public events.

In 2002 both artists were discovered by veteran reggaeton producer and former artist Q Mack Daddy (whom also discovered Magnate y Valentino and worked for Héctor el Father's Gold Star Music record label).  Q Mac gave the duo their first big break in Puerto Rico on the fourth volume of his famous compilation series "The Warriors". After debuting with "Una Noche Mas" from Q Mac's album "The Warriors 4: Los 14 Guerreros", the song was a local hit in Puerto Rican radio and caught the attention of many record producers as most people noticed the duo's similarity to popular reggaeton artists Zion y Lennox.  After working with DJ Negro on The Noise Live: Asi Comienza El Ruido and Mr. Notty (Money Machine) for the compilation "Ban-2 Korrupto", the success of these songs drove a bidding war between Puerto Rican labels to sign them.  Ultimately, the duo chose to sign with Pina Records in early 2004 making their first appearance in the greatest hits various artists album "Pina All-Stars 2" which included 3 new songs from Rakim y Ken-Y to introduce the duo to a wider audience.

After being featured on reggaeton records with veteran labelmate Polaco, the duo received their first big break on an international scale in 2005 by working with the renowned artists Don Omar and Nicky Jam.  Rakim y Ken-Y recorded the collaboration "Si La Vez" with Don Omar from his various artists album "Los Bandoleros" executively produced by Omar.Nicky Jam gave them a chance to make an appearance on his album, Vida Escante. They were featured on "Pasado" and "Me Estoy Muriendo". These songs were very popular within the reggaeton community.  The duo's contribution to the Don Omar album, helped mold the group into a more mainstream attraction.  Soon afterwards Chencho (from reggaeton duo Plan B) gave Rakim y Ken-Y the opportunity to appear on his various artists album "El Draft" co-executively produced with Boy Wonder (Chosen Few Entertainment).  Boy Wonder, producer of the CD/DVD Chosen Few El Documental and Chencho, of the popular but controversial duo Plan B, were producing a CD entitled "El Draft" del reggaeton which provided up and coming artists a shot at recognition. Fans were given the opportunity to vote for their favorite artists and Rakim y Ken-Y won the competition which made their song into the album's lead single.   "Tu No Estas" from "El Draft Del Reggaeton" became RKM y Ken-Y's first song to chart in the United States.  This newfound exposure built up anticipation for their debut album, "Masterpiece: Nuestra Obra Maestra" distributed by Universal Latino in partnership with Pina Records.

International success 
In 2006, Rakim & Ken-Y's debut album "Masterpiece: Nuestra Obra Maestra" was released, debuting at #2 in the Latin Billboards, behind only Marc Anthony's "Sigo siendo yo." Their single "Down" debuted at #1.. On August 18, the duo had their first concert in a sold-out Choliseo. Currently, they are working on a Pina Records compilation album titled "Los Magnificos." The album was nominated for Premio Lo Nuestro of 2007. Their first hit single was "Down", reaching #1 on the Billboard Hot Latin Songs chart in 2006 and would win Best Reggaeton Song at the Billboard Latin Music Awards. Four other singles were released from the album, as well as music videos.  The album went double Latin platinum in the United States and sold about 600,000 copies worldwide.
The duo had many successful tours across the world for various years after The Masterpiece including headlining the world renowned Viña Del Mar festival in Chile. They have released the songs performed on tour on an album entitled Masterpiece: World Tour (Sold Out). They have also released a special edition version of the album entitled Masterpiece Commemorative Edition.

Their 2nd studio album, The Royalty La Realeza, was released on September 9, 2008.

The first single released from the album was "Mis Días Sin Ti". Raphy Pina announced the return of Rakim & Ken-Y February 15, 2008. The date was actually a concert they held in the Choliseo in San Juan, Puerto Rico. The concert's headline was "Romantic en el Choliseo". Reggaeton artists like Wisin & Yandel, Tito "El Bambino", Nicky Jam, Rene Moz and Arcángel were present. Other artists like N'Klabe and Karis were also present.

And three years later they released their final studio album "Forever" on February 14, 2011, Two singles were released from the album, And have features in this album Zion & Lennox, Alexis & Fido and Arthur Hanlon.

On 2012 released Cuando Te Enamores which became part of the most popular album of 2013 La Fórmula featuring Plan B, Zion & Lennox, Arcángel, Lobo and more. Which was the last work of Rakim & Ken-Y before returning as a Duo on mid 2017.

Since their first album, Rakim & Ken-Y have appeared and guest starred on many songs. They have worked with artists such as Cruzito, Don Omar, Daddy Yankee, José Feliciano, Pitbull, Héctor el Father, David Bisbal, Ivy Queen, Chino & Nacho, Hector Acosta "El Torito, Plan B, Tony Dize and Zion & Lennox.

Separation 
On April 10, 2013, the producer Raphy Pina announced that the duo would separate but they continued with their scheduled performances and appearances. Both artists took this decision with each focusing on future solo projects.

After Ken-Y left Pina Records he signed with a label called Fresh Production. On January 22, 2016, Ken-Y released his first solo album The King Of Romance which features Nicky Jam, Natti Natasha and Manny Montes. The singles that were released in this album was Te Invito A Volar, Sentirte Mía, Fórmula De Amor and Como Lo Hacia Yo. The album hit No. 1 in the Latín Rhythm Albums category.

Rakim was also making an album called Diferente which means Different which is an album that will change how Rakim is viewed as not only a rapper but a singer too. Diferente was originally supposed to be released in 2017 but was never released due him and Ken-Y getting back together. But on a recent post on August 15, 2020 by RKM in his official Instagram that Diferente is Coming.

Reunion 
On June 23, 2017 and after four years of separation. Rakim & Ken-Y return with the perfect formula to conquer their seat. They Grew up together and felt they needed to work together in order to be successful.  Under the command of its creator Raphy Pina the duo announces their return ready to fall back on the world with their unique style. The duo starts their union with the remix of success played by Arcángel & De La Ghetto's  Más Que Ayer.

The Duo in October 2019 has had their most recent hit "Cuando Lo Olvides" That peaked in Latin charts this song goes back to their romantic roots. In mid 2020 rumors speculated that the duo are not together anymore after RKM started working on his solo album Diferente, RKM and Ken-Y both confirmed the separations are now currently working on their solo projects.

From they’re Return to Separation (2017-2020) the duo has collaborated with huge stars like Arcángel, De La Ghetto, Daddy Yankee, Plan B, Natti Natasha, Ozuna, Noriel, Darkiel, Divino, Chris Wandell and Lyanno and more. They had pretty great comeback songs like Tonta, Zum Zum and Cuando Lo Olvides.

Discography

Studio albums 
 Masterpiece (2006)
 The Royalty: La Realeza (2008)
 Forever (2011)

Live albums 
 Masterpiece: World Tour (Sold Out) (2006)
 Romantico 360°: Live From Puerto Rico (2009)

Compilation albums 
 Masterpiece "Commemorative Edition" (2007)
 The Last Chapter (2010)
 La Fórmula  (2012)

Solo albums 
 Ken-Y: The King Of Romance (2016)
 R.K.M : Diferente (Coming Soon)

Singles 
 "Down"
 "Me Matas"
 "Dame Lo Que Quiero"
 "Igual Que Ayer"
 "Down (Remix)" (featuring Héctor el Father)
 "Oh Oh, ¿Porqué Te Están Velando?"
 "Llorarás"
 "Mis Días Sin Ti"
 "Te Regalo Amores"
 "Tuve Un Sueño" (featuring Plan B)
 "Vicio Del Pecado"
 "Quiero Un Pueblo Que Cante" (featuring Plan B, Cruzito & Tony Dize)
 "Te Ame En Mis Suenos"
 "Por Amor A Ti"
 "Más"
 "Mi Corazón Esta Muerto"
 "Cuando Te Enamores"
 "Princesa" (Ken-Y only)
 "Donde Estas" (RKM Only)
 "Navegar En Mis Recuerdos" (Ken-Y only)
 "Quedate Junto A Mi"
 "Regalo De Quinceanera" (Ken-Y only)
 "Prefiero Morir" (Ken-Y only) 
 "A Ella Le Gusta El Dembow" (featuring Zion & Lennox)
 "Tonta" (Featuring Natti Natasha)
"Zum Zum" (Featuring Daddy Yankee & Arcángel) 
''No Reciclo Amores"
"Una Noche Mas"
”Cuando Lo Olvides”
“Mascara”
”Pa’l Espejo”
"Jugaste a Perderme" (Featuring Peter Nieto) (2021)
"Paso a Paso" (Featuring 4K Musica) (2022)

Collaborations

Awards and nominations

Grammy Awards

Billboard Latin Music Awards

Premios Lo Nuestro

Premios Juventud

Premios MTV Latinoamérica

Tu Música Urbana Awards

Viña del Mar International Song Festival 

|-
| style="text-align:center;" rowspan="3"|2009 || rowspan="3" | R.K.M y Ken-y || "Gaviota de Plata" || 
|-
||"Antorcha de Oro" || 
|-
||"Antorcha de Plata"|| 
|}

Premios People en Español 

|-
| style="text-align:center;" rowspan="3"|2011 || rowspan="1" | R.K.M y Ken-y || "Mejor Cantante o Grupo Urbano" || 
|-
|}

References 

Living people
People from Gurabo, Puerto Rico
Puerto Rican reggaeton musicians
21st-century Puerto Rican male singers
Puerto Rican musical duos
Reggaeton duos
Musical groups established in 2003
Universal Music Latino artists
Year of birth missing (living people)